Samson Akinnire (born 12 June 1986) is a Nigerian visual artist, painter and sculptor, based in Lagos state, Nigeria.

Early life and education 
Samson Akinnire was born and brought up in Ajegunle, Lagos State. He obtained a higher national diploma in Sculpture and design from the Lagos State Polytechnic in 2011 and was awarded all round student by his faculty.

Selected exhibition 

 2018 Art X Lagos
 2019 Say My Name exhibition in London
 2019 Say My Name exhibition in Los Angeles
 2020 Signature African Art Gallery · London, United Kingdom

Selected works 

 Say My Name 2020
 Values
 Play Time 2019
 Emergence 2019
 Gele Series II 2020

References 

Lagos State Polytechnic alumni
Living people
Nigerian painters
Nigerian artists
1986 births